Neldasaurus is an extinct genus of dvinosaurian temnospondyl within the family Trimerorhachidae. Neldasaurus was a low-skulled amphibian that resembled Trimerorhachis in many ways, including size, skull proportions, body and limb structure, dermal roof pattern, and palate Tschopp et al. 2015). Based on the presence of fossils in the Clear Fork Formation, Neldasaurus was believe to live in the Texas Lower Permian (Chase 1965) until the subsequent examination of stratigraphy and paleontology of the Clear fork Formation indicated that it is of Late Triassic age. Therefore, Neldasaurus lived about 155-150 million years ago, in Late Jurassic period, and was an mid-size herbivorous dinosaur estimated to have reached a length of 9-12 meters (30-40 feet).

History and naming
The name Neldasaurus was chosen to honor Nelda E. Wright, a Research Assistant at Harvord University, who discovered the holotype specimen of the dinosaur. This holotype, which consisted of a nearly complete skull and some postcranial bones, was discovered in 1954 under the direction of Dr. Alfred S. Romer. This discovery allowed for a detailed description of the specimen and its classification as a new genus.

Paleobiology
Neldasaurus was an herbivorous dinosaur that likely fed on low-growing vegetation such as ferns and cycads (cite Wilson and Sereno 1998). Its skeletal features suggest that it was a medium-sized sauropod with a relatively short neck compared to other sauropods in its clade (cite Janensch 1950). Its teeth were spatulate and relatively large, with the largest teeth in the premaxilla. Neldasaurus lived in a humid, forested environment during the Late Jurassic period, about 155-150 million years ago. Its fossils have been found in the Tendaguru Formation of Tanzania.

Morphology
Neldasaurus differs from Trimerorhachis in the following aspects: orbits midway between snout and occiput; snout narrow; lacrimal elongate but not reaching the external naris; nasals, prefrontals and frontals elongate; external nares close together, their long axes more or less parallel; jugal entering the orbital border; prevomers elongate and the choanae broadly separated from the anterior border of the interpterygoid vacuities; larger number of teeth than in T rimer orhachis in the lower jaw and the marginal series of the upper jaw; a tusk pair on the ectopterygoid; a foramen in the lower jaw for the reception of vomerine tusks; opisthotic and prootic unossified; pleurocentra as high as the intercentra; clavicles meeting in front of the interclavicle (CHASE 1965).

Neldasaurus had a short neck compared to other sauropods in its clade, with only 12 cervical vertebrae (cite Janensch 1950). The central elements of the neural arches display less regional variation compared to the neural arch elements. As a result, the neural arches in the "cervical" region (as shown in Figure 9, B) have relatively small neural spines.

The forelimbs are small for an animal similar size to Neldasaurus. The humerus is relatively long, and a well-developed deltoid crest was on the radial edge of the humerus. The radius is a short one and is slightly shorter than the ulna as expected.

References

Further reading 
 
 
 
 
 
 
 {

Dvinosaurs
Cisuralian temnospondyls of North America
Permian geology of Texas
Fossil taxa described in 1965